Ulrich Ewald Berthold Bettac (2 May 1897 – 20 April 1959), was an Austrian actor and theatre director. He was especially well known for his work as a character actor at the Burgtheater in Vienna; he also had a fairly extensive film career.

Selected filmography
 The Girl from Capri (1924)
 The Mistress of Monbijou (1924)
 False Shame (1926)
 A Night at the Grand Hotel (1931)
 Come Back to Me (1944)
Mysterious Shadows (1949)
 Duel with Death (1949)
1. April 2000 (1952)
Knall and Fall as Imposters (1952)
The Great Temptation (1952) 
 Adventure in Vienna (1952)
 Arlette Conquers Paris (1953)
 The Divorcée (1953)
 Mask in Blue (1953)
The Eternal Waltz (1954)
Sissi (1955)
 André and Ursula (1955)
 Mozart (1955)
 Goetz von Berlichingen (1955)
Sissi – The Young Empress (1956)

External links
 Ulrich Bettac at Österreich-Lexikon (in German)
 

1897 births
1959 deaths
Austrian male film actors
Austrian male silent film actors
Austrian theatre directors
Austrian male stage actors
Austrian people of German descent
German male film actors
German male silent film actors
Actors from Szczecin
20th-century German male actors
20th-century Austrian male actors
People from the Province of Pomerania
Theatre people from Vienna